Gbikinti FC is a Togolese football club, based in Bassar. They play in the top division in Togolese football. Stade de Bassar, which has capacity for 1,000 people, is the venue of Gbikinti.

References 

Football clubs in Togo